Baritius acuminata is a moth of the family Erebidae first described by Francis Walker in 1856. It is found in Brazil, Argentina and Paraguay.

References

Phaegopterina
Moths described in 1856